The Hup language (also called Hupdë, Hupdá, Hupdé, Hupdá Makú, Jupdá, Makú, Makú-Hupdá, Makú De, Hupda, and Jupde) is one of the four Naduhup languages. It is spoken by the Hupda indigenous Amazonian peoples who live on the border between Colombia and the Brazilian state of Amazonas. There are approximately 1500 speakers of the Hup language. As of 2005, according to Epps, Hup is not seriously endangered – although the actual number of speakers is few, all Hupda children learn Hup as their first language.

History 
Although their territory was the target of forced transferrals throughout the 17th and 18th centuries, due to their isolation, the Naduhup were among the least affected, since they were protected by the geography of their land. They were also the target of several Catholic missions, though those ultimately failed, as the Naduhup refused to send their children to Catholic education centres.

Contact with the Tucanoan people, also known as the River Indians, who live along the rivers rather than in the forests, has significantly impacted the Naduhup, both culturally and linguistically. Since before European contact, the Naduhup and Tukanoan peoples have engaged in trade, the Naduhup providing labour and hunted meats and the Tucanoan providing agricultural goods. However, the Naduhup are viewed as inferior by the Tucanoan, because of their linguistic and lifestyle differences. Because of this inequality, most Naduhup people can understand and/or speak a Tucanoan, while it is the opposite vice versa – very few, if any Tucanoan people speak Hup.

Language profile 
Relatively few linguistic materials of Hup are available, due to the isolation of the Hupda. Incomplete vocabulary lists and dictionaries were established in 1955 (Giacone) and 1993 (Erickson and Erickson). The most complete descriptive grammar of Hup, A Grammar of Hup, was written by Patience Epps in 2005, was updated in 2008, and outlines Hup phonology, parts of speech, morphology, aspect, tense, modality, among many other features.

Hup is one of four languages in the Naduhup (Makú) family. Though Makú is the term most commonly used to refer to this language family, there is controversy over its usage, since it is also an ethnic slur, translating to “without language”, used by the Tukanoan towards the Naduhup. There has not been a consensus on a replacement term, although Epps proposed “Naduhup”, which combines the names of the four members of the language family - Nadëb, Dâw, Hup, and Yuhup.

Phonology

Consonants 
There are nineteen contrasting consonants in Hup, with the twentieth /p’/ occurring in the morpheme-initial position in only one word of only some Hup dialects. /j/, /g/, and /ç/ only appear in morpheme-final position, while all other consonants may appear in morpheme initial, medial, and final position. Hup has glottalized consonants of both stops and approximants which can be seen in the chart below. This language also has nasal allophones of the voiced stops.

Adapted from Epps (2005), p. 40.

Vowels 
Hup contains a large segmental phonemic inventory, in comparison to the Tukanoan languages that neighbour it geographically. Hup vowels are composed of nine contrasting sounds, with no occurring diphthongs:

However, these nine sounds occur only in non-nasal contexts. In nasal morphemes, there are only six distinct vowels:

Adapted from Epps (2005)

According to Epps (2005), this indicates that the contrast between mid-vowels and high/low vowels are neutralised in nasal contexts. Nasalisation is morphemic at the syllable level and targets all segments – generally, every syllable is either fully nasal or fully oral.

Tonality 
Hup tonality functions in what is called a word-accent system – there is a word-level tone contrast system; the contrast is restricted to one syllable per word, which is predictable and also exhibits other features of stressed syllables (greater intensity, longer duration, and higher pitch). There are two tones: rising and high, which only appear in nouns and adjectives.

Morphology 
Nouns and verbs are open class, while adjectives are closed class. Nouns usually appear as arguments of clauses and can appear bare in the clause, while verbs must be inflected in some way. Hup is highly agglutinative and concatenative, with a high rate of synthesis and low rate of phonological fusion of morphemes. Therefore, its morphemes are easily segmented. Roots typically undergo compounding, while formatives are affixed or cliticised.

Personal pronouns

Adapted from Epps (2005), p. 138

Semiverbal "Verby" nouns 
Some nouns of Hup are semi-verbal, namely those which have to do with the passage of time, as well as periods of time, which are “inherently progressive and impermanent.”

“Passage of time” words:
 wəhə́d "old man"
 wɑ́ "old woman"
 dóʔ "child"

“Periods of time” words:
 wɑ́g "day"
 j'ə́b "night"

While these words belong to the noun class (they typically appear as arguments of a clause, and aspectual inflection is not required), they have verb-like qualities, such as occurrence in verbal compounds (which is normally restricted to only verbs):

Respect markers 
The enclitic =wəd, derived from the word for “old man” wəhə́d, can be inserted as a respect marker when referring to spiritual beings or other humans. The feminine form of this is =wa.

This marker is usually used to refer to someone older or of higher status, though it can also be used to indicate someone to be feared, especially when used to refer to dangerous spirits.

The usage of =wəd is also not necessarily respectful. The enclitic can also be affixed to children's names as a sign of affection, comparable to doing the same in English with the titles “Mister” or “Miss”.

Syntax

Case and agreement
Hup is nominative-accusative. All subjects are unmarked, while the object and other noun cases are suffixed. Which suffix is used can depend on number, animacy, type of noun, and grammatical function, as shown in the table below. Case marking extends also to the noun phrase and relative clause, and the suffixes attach to the final constituent of the phrase.

Adapted from Epps (2005), p. 143

Though the object case and directional oblique markers are almost identical phonologically, the only difference being the stress, directional oblique is mainly used to indicate direction, and sometimes, location, in which it coincides with oblique case.

Semantics

Plurals
The plurality marker for nouns is =d'əh and follows an animacy hierarchy: humans, animals, and inanimates. For humans, plural marking is obligatory, though exception is made for a non-specific referent.

However, the marker is present for groups of people, which are considered conceptually plural.

Animals are generally also marked for plurality, but differ in that the marker is not obligatory for groups of animals. As with humans, non-specific referents are also not marked.

{{interlinear|indent=3
|núp nutæ̌n yɑʔɑ́md'əh hɨd wæd-nɨ́h-ɑy-ɑ́h
|this today jaguarPL 3pl eat-NEG-INCH-DECL
|"So today jaguars don’t eat (people)." (Epps (2005), p. 168)

Inanimate objects are not marked for plurality and rely on numerals to indicate such. Plural inanimate entities are regarded with low importance, due to usually having low conceptual salience, and therefore are also almost always unmarked for number in discourse as well.

Abbreviations

OBJ:object
RESP:respect marker
ITG:intangible
COOP:cooperative
DIR:directional oblique
DYNM:dynamic
FLR:following marker
VENT:ventive

References

 Patience Epps (2008) A Grammar of Hup. Mouton de Gruyter.
 Moore, Barbara J.; Franklin, Gail L. Breves notícias da língua Maku-Hupda. Summer Institute of Linguistics, 1979

External links

 Hup Vocabulary List (from the World Loanword Database)
 Hup basic lexicon at the Global Lexicostatistical Database
 Hup Collection of Patience Epps at the Archive of the Indigenous Languages of Latin America. Contains audio recordings and transcriptions of Hup language materials, "most from the Middle Tiquié River (primarily villages of Tat Dëh / Taracua Igarapé and Barreira Alta). A few texts from other communities, including Umari Norte of the upper Tiquié."

Languages of Brazil
Nadahup languages